The Fort Worth Star-Telegram is an American daily newspaper serving Fort Worth and Tarrant County, the western half of the North Texas area known as the Metroplex. It is owned by The McClatchy Company.

History
In May 1905, Amon G. Carter accepted a job as an advertising space salesman in Fort Worth. A few months later, he agreed to help finance and run a new newspaper in town. The Fort Worth Star printed its first newspaper on February 1, 1906, with Carter as the advertising manager, and Louis J. Wortham as its first editor.

The Star lost money, and was in danger of going bankrupt when Carter had an audacious idea: raise additional money and purchase his newspaper's main competition, the Fort Worth Telegram. In November 1908, the Star purchased the Telegram for $100,000, and the two newspapers combined on January 1, 1909, into the Fort Worth Star-Telegram.

From 1923 until after World War II, the Star-Telegram was distributed over one of the largest circulation areas of any newspaper in the South, serving not just Fort Worth but also West Texas, New Mexico and western Oklahoma. The newspaper created WBAP in 1922 and Texas' first television station, WBAP-TV, in 1948.

Market
The Star-Telegram’s circulation area is the Fort Worth/Arlington metro area (four counties) and 14 surrounding counties. The newspaper's primary market is the four-county Fort Worth/Arlington metro area, as well as the Dallas and Fort Worth suburb of Grand Prairie. The Fort Worth/Arlington metro area is the western part of the fourth-largest U.S. metropolitan area, the Dallas/Fort Worth/Arlington Combined Statistical Area. Fort Worth/Arlington ranks 29th most populous as a metro area.

Pulitzer prizes
1981 Pulitzer Prize for Spot News Photography: Larry C. Price for "his photographs from Liberia".
1985 Pulitzer Prize for Public Service: Mark Thompson "for reporting which revealed that nearly 250 U.S. servicemen had lost their lives as a result of a design problem in helicopters built by Bell Helicopter—a revelation which ultimately led the Army to ground almost 600 Huey helicopters pending their modification".

Online presence
The Star-Telegram is the nation's oldest continuously operating online newspaper. StarText, an ASCII-based service, was started in 1982 and eventually integrated into the paper's current website, star-telegram.com.

Awards
The newspaper's "Titletown, TX" video series earned three 2017 Lone Star Emmys, the first in Star-Telegram history, and an award for excellence and innovation in visual storytelling from the 2017 Online Journalism Awards.

In 2006 the Star-Telegram won the Missouri Lifestyle Journalism Award for General Excellence, Class IV.

See also 
 List of newspapers in Texas

References

Further reading

External links
 The Star-Telegram official site
 The Star-Telegram official mobile site
 
 
 

Fort Worth, Texas
Daily newspapers published in Texas
Newspapers published in the Dallas–Fort Worth metroplex
McClatchy publications
Pulitzer Prize-winning newspapers
Publications established in 1906
Pulitzer Prize for Public Service winners
Former subsidiaries of The Walt Disney Company
1906 establishments in Texas